Justin Lynch (born August 27, 1996) is an American former swimmer.

As a high schooler, Lynch bested national age-group records set by world and Olympic champion Michael Phelps.

Justin Lynch was born in Vallejo, California. He swam at University of California, Berkeley from 2014 to 2018. Lynch is an alumnus of Visions in Education, a tuition-free public charter school.

References

External links
 
 

1996 births
Living people
American male butterfly swimmers
American male freestyle swimmers
Universiade medalists in swimming
Universiade gold medalists for the United States
Medalists at the 2017 Summer Universiade
California Golden Bears men's swimmers
20th-century American people
21st-century American people